Joanne Marie Rodríguez Veve (San Juan, Puerto Rico; born February 3, 1983)  is a Puerto Rican lawyer and politician. She currently serves as at-large Senator at the 27th Senate of Puerto Rico (2021-2025), representing the Proyecto Dignidad party.She was elected during the 2020 Puerto Rico Senate election and is the first senator of the party.

Education

Rodríguez Veve earned a Bachelor's Degree in Political Science and a Juris Doctor from the University of Puerto Rico, Río Piedras Campus. Then she completed a Master's Degree in Canon law from the Pontifical University of Salamanca in Spain, and has studied History of Puerto Rico at the Center for Advanced Studies on Puerto Rico and the Caribbean

Professional career

She has worked as a lawyer for ecclesiastical processes of matrimonial nullity and in the Human Resources field, specializing in labor matters management.

In 2020, she announced that she would be running for a seat at the Senate of Puerto Rico at-large under the Proyecto Dignidad party. She ended up at second place with 88,716 (7.33%) votes and was sworn in as Senator on January 2, 2021 with the rest of the elected senators.

References 

Puerto Rican politicians

1983 births
Living people
Members of the Senate of Puerto Rico
People from San Juan, Puerto Rico
University of Puerto Rico alumni
Puerto Rican women lawyers
Latino conservatism in the United States